"Towards Revival" is a Chinese patriotic song composed by Yin Qing and written by Li Weifu in 2009 for the 60th anniversary of the People's Republic of China. Production of the song was jointly organised by the Shenzhen Municipal Party Committee Propaganda Department and the Shenzhen Broadcasting Group, and was meant to commemorate the progress made by the Chinese Communist Party since the foundation of the People's Republic of China.

Production
"Towards Revival" was written to be used as the finale of The Road to Recovery, a song and dance epic made to commemorate the 60th anniversary of the People's Republic of China. The song was jointly commissioned by the Shenzhen Municipal Party Committee Propaganda Department and Shenzhen Radio and Television Group to portray and follow "footsteps of the Republic in the past 60 years". The song was initially envisioned as a traditional march, but was altered in production to cater to a modern audience, eventually being modified and reworked as many as one hundred times. Lyrically, the song was intended to signify the rejuvenation of China, adopting an optimistic outlook on the future of the People's Republic. The song proved to be popular among both the Chinese population and the state, and was played at the opening ceremony of the 16th Asian Games in Guangzhou, the 90th Anniversary of the Chinese Communist Party Celebrations, the opening ceremony of the Shenzhen World University Games in 2011, and numerous regional celebrations and festivals. The song also received several awards, most notably the Five One Project award in September 2012.

Lyrics

See also
Dong Fang Hong I
The East Is Red (1965 film)
Honglaowai
Maoism
"Ode to the Motherland"
"Sailing the Seas Depends on the Helmsman"
"Without the Communist Party, There Would Be No New China"
Xi Jinping
Shenzhen

References

Chinese patriotic songs
Asian anthems
Chinese military marches